Monte Terminillo is a massif in the Monti Reatini, part of the Abruzzi Apennine range in central Italy.

It is a typical Apennine massif, both for its morphology, articulated but not exceedingly sharp, and for the fauna and vegetation. Its slopes are separated by the neighbouring smaller massifs by deep valleys, including the Valle Leonina, leading to Leonessa, and the Ravara and Capo Scura valleys leading to that of the Velino River. On the opposite sides are the Valle dell'Inferno ("Hell's Valley") and Valle degli Angeli ("Angels' Valley") leading to Rieti's plain and the mounts of Cantalice.

The Terminillo is an active ski resort.

See also
Sabena Flight 503

External links

monteterminillo.net 
terminillo.it 

Terminillo
Terminillo
Ski areas and resorts in Italy